Vassilis Lipiridis (alternate spellings: Vasilis, Lypiridis) (born January 1, 1967, in Edessa, Greece) is a retired  Greek professional basketball player. At 2.02 m (6 ft 7  in) tall, he played at the power forward position.

Professional career
Lipridis started his basketball playing career with the youth clubs of Edessaikos. He spent one season with HAN Thessaloniki, during the 1984–85 season.

Lipiridis played with great success as a defensive power forward with Aris, winning with them, the Greek League championship six times (1986, 1987, 1988, 1989, 1990, 1991) and the Greek Cup 5 times (1987, 1988, 1989, 1990, 1992).

He also took part in 3 consecutive EuroLeague Final Fours of the FIBA European Champions Cup: Ghent 1988, Munich 1989, and Zaragoza 1990. While he played there, Aris joined the elite of European basketball clubs, but a European-wide title did not come for Lipiridis until much later, in 1993, when the club won the 2nd-tier level FIBA Cup Winners' Cup in Torino.

In 1996, Lipiridis joined MENT, for some months, and in 1997, he joined OFI Crete basketball club, for one season.

National team career
Lipiridis was a member of the senior men's Greek national basketball team that finished in 6th place at the 1990 FIBA World Championship. He also played at the EuroBasket 1991.

Awards and accomplishments
6× Greek League Champion: (1986, 1987, 1988, 1989, 1990, 1991)
5× Greek Cup Winner: (1987, 1988, 1989, 1990, 1992)
Saporta Cup Champion: (1993)

References

External links 
FIBA Profile
FIBA Europe Profile
Hellenic Federation Profile 

1967 births
Living people
Aris B.C. players
Centers (basketball)
Greek men's basketball players
HANTH B.C. players
1990 FIBA World Championship players
MENT B.C. players
OFI Crete B.C. players
Footballers from Edessa, Greece
Power forwards (basketball)